Robert Willis (1799, Leith – 21 September 1878, Barnes) was a Scottish physician, librarian, and medical historian.

Education
Willis was born at Leith of a good Edinburgh family. His father was Robert Willis, a merchant at Leith. He was educated at the High School of Edinburgh where he formed a lifelong friendship with his contemporary James Syme who became one of the greatest surgeons (LeFanu, 1974); Willis's sister married Syme, and their daughter, Agnes, married the pioneer of antiseptic surgery Joseph Lister. He graduated at Edinburgh (1819), went to the College of Surgeons (1823), the College of Physicians (1837), and was the first librarian of the College of Surgeons in London (1828–45).

Work as a librarian (1828–1845)
Willis compiled a catalogue of the books of the College of Surgeons which was published in 1831 (Cope, 1959)

Medical practice (1846–1878)

Willis lived and practised at The Homestead, Barnes, in succession to Dr. John Scott, from 1846 till his death.

Family

Willis's son, Robert Watson Willis, served as secretary of the Football Association, and built Hinxton House, East Sheen, in 1877.

Scholarly work
Willis is remembered for his scholarly translation from Latin of the complete works of William Harvey, published by the Sydenham Society in 1847 (Sykes, 2001).

Confusion with Robert Willis (1800–1875)
The acoustic work of another man with the same name, Robert Willis (1800–1875), is often mistakenly attributed to Willis. This is for instance the case in Robert Beyer's Sounds of Our Times: Two Hundred Years of Acoustics (1998). Sometimes, it is the other way round: Thierry Mandoul's Entre raison et utopie: l'Histoire de l'architecture d'Auguste Choisy (2008) erroneously gives the dates 1799–1878 for the Willis who worked in architecture.

Works by Willis
Robert Willis: Translation of Spurzheim's ‘Anatomy of the Brain', 1826 link
Robert Willis: Translation of Pierre Rayer's 'Treatise on diseases of the skin', 1835
A theoretical and practical treatise on the diseases of the skin 1845 edition
Robert Willis: Urinary Diseases and their Treatment, 1838 link
Robert Willis: Illustrations of cutaneous disease, 1839–1841
Robert Willis: On the Treatment of Stone in the Bladder, 1842
(critical) Review by W.C., Dr. Willis on the Treatment of Stone in the Bladder, Provincial Medical Journal and Retrospect of the Medical Sciences, Vol. 4, No. 7 (21 May 1842), pp. 133–136 link
C. F. H. Marx and Robert Willis: On the decrease of disease effected by the progress of civilization, London, 1844 link
Robert Willis: Translation of Rudolph Wagner's ‘Elements of Physiology’, 1845 link
Robert Willis: The Works of William Harvey, M. D, London, 1847 link
Robert Willis: Translation of Spinoza's Tractatus Theologico-Politicus, 1862 link
Robert Willis: Benedict de Spinoza; His life, Correspondence, and Ethics, 1870 link
Robert Willis: Servetus and Calvin, London, 1877 link
Robert Willis: William Harvey, a history of the discovery of the circulation of the blood, 1878 link

Other references

Willis, Robert at Dictionary of National Biography
Roger Cooter: The Cultural Meaning of Popular Science: Phrenology and the Organization of Consent in Nineteenth-Century Britain, 1985 (page 299 has a biographical notice)
Herman Goodman: Notable contributors to the knowledge of dermatology, 1953
Victor Cornelius Medvei: A history of endocrinology, 1982
Proceedings of the Royal Medical & Chirurgical Society of London vol. viii, 1880, p. 390
The Collected Letters of Thomas and Jane Welsh Carlyle: October 1833 – December 1834, 1973
W. R. LeFanu: "Robert Willis – physician, librarian, medical historian", Proceedings of the XXIII International Congress of the History of Medicine, London, 2–9 September 1972, Volume 2, 1974, p. 1111
Alan H. Sykes: Sharpey's fibres: the life of William Sharpey, the father of modern physiology in England, 2001
Zachary Cope: The Royal College of Surgeons of England: a history, 1959
Barnes history
Charles R. Fikar, Oscar L. Corral: "Non-librarian health professionals becoming librarians and information specialists: results of an Internet survey", Bull Med Libr Assoc. 2001 January; 89(1): 59–67.
Robert Paterson: Memorials of the life of James Syme, professor of clinical surgery in the University of Edinburgh, etc., 1874

References

External links
 
 
 

1799 births
1878 deaths
19th-century Scottish historians
19th-century Scottish medical doctors
19th-century British translators
Alumni of the University of Edinburgh
Latin–English translators
People educated at the Royal High School, Edinburgh
People from Leith
Scottish librarians
Scottish medical historians
Scottish translators